Imogen Harding Brodie (June 8, 1878 - August 16, 1956) was a vocal teacher and contralto soloist; she was the wife of the American Envoy to the court of King Rama VI of Siam.

Early life
Imogen Harding Brodie was born on June 8, 1878, the daughter of George A. and Jennie B. Harding. She was the great granddaughter of Samuel K. Barlow. Brodie's great grandmother was Susanna Lee of South Carolina, whose father, William Lee, was a lieutenant of artillery in the Revolutionary war.

Career
She was active in civic affairs. She was a vocal teacher until 1915. For many years she was a contralto soloist in various Portland churches. From 1921 to 1925 moved in Bangkok where her husband was the American Envoy to the court of King Rama VI.

She was a member of the Professional Woman's League of Portland.

Personal life
In 1905 she married Edward Everett Brodie (1876-1939), a leader among newspaper men, and had two children, Madelen Jane and George Harding. She lived at Brodacre-on-Clackamas, Ore. R. F. D. 2, Oregon City, Oregon.

She died on August 16, 1956, in Multnomah, Oregon.

References

1878 births
1956 deaths
American contraltos
American vocal coaches
American expatriates in Thailand